Lúcia Vânia Abrão Costa (born October 15, 1944) is a Brazilian politician. She has represented Goiás in the Federal Senate since 2003. Previously she was a Deputy from Goiás from 1987 to 1995 and from 1999 to 2003. She is a member of the Brazilian Socialist Party.

References

Living people
1944 births
Members of the Federal Senate (Brazil)
Members of the Chamber of Deputies (Brazil) from Goiás
Brazilian Socialist Party politicians